Marko Barišić (born 3 March 1993) is a Croatian football defender, currently playing for lower league side Psunj Sokol Okucani.

References

External links
 
 Marko Barišić at Sportnet.hr 
 

1993 births
Living people
Footballers from Split, Croatia
Association football fullbacks
Croatian footballers
Croatia youth international footballers
HNK Hajduk Split players
NK Primorac 1929 players
RNK Split players
NK Imotski players
NK Croatia Zmijavci players
FK Dukla Banská Bystrica players
NK Hrvatski Dragovoljac players
Croatian Football League players
First Football League (Croatia) players
2. Liga (Slovakia) players
Croatian expatriate footballers
Expatriate footballers in Slovakia
Croatian expatriate sportspeople in Slovakia